The Bullhead Trail is an American hiking trail in the Great Smoky Mountains National Park, in Sevier County, Tennessee. The trail ascends Mount Le Conte, the tallest  (and sixth highest) mountain east of the Mississippi River and offers outstanding views before joining the Rainbow Falls Trail before terminating near the LeConte Lodge.

Vital information
 The Bullhead Trail is the least traveled route to the summit of Mount Le Conte (elev. ; 2,010 m)
 A short connector trail that extends from the Sugarlands Visitor Center to the Rainbow Falls Trail is one way to access the trailhead.
 The trailhead is located inside of the Great Smoky Mountains National Park, off Cherokee Orchard Road, 3.4 miles (5.5 km) from Gatlinburg, Tennessee.

Landmarks/overlooks
 Bullhead
 English Mountain/Sugarland Mountain overlook
 Balsam Point

Trail synopsis

Trailhead to English Mountain overlook

The beginning of the Bullhead Trail is, for all intents and purposes, actually the trailhead to the Rainbow Falls Trail. Both trails are designated the same parking area, and because of their proximity (the two paths are separated only by a  spur trail) many hikers choose to ascend one trail (usually the Rainbow Falls Trail) and descend the other. Given this, however, the trail is still the least popular route along Mount Le Conte, probably because of its isolation (in the woods, near to but away from its crowded neighbor trail) and that it contains no spectacular landmarks along its path. But it is this isolation that makes the trail so desirable to those who favor solitude when hiking.

The trail itself begins gently underneath the covering of young hemlocks, quickly offering views through the brush of a second growth forest. The first two miles (3 km) of the trail consist of much switchbacking, as the hiker slowly but steadily gains elevation towards the Le Conte summit, and includes a pass just beneath Bullhead, a Le Conte heath bald which, from a distance, apparently gives the impression of a bull's head, from which the trail is named. At  a boulder field offers the hiker a glimpse into the Le Conte Creek valley below, even offering views of the Space Needle in downtown Gatlinburg. On a clear day, the hiker can see magnificent views of both English and Sugarland mountains to the northeast and southwest respectively. The rock is large enough to provide a suitable resting place close to the halfway mark of the trail.

English Mountain overlook to the Leconte Lodge
Moving along toward the LeConte Lodge, the footpath soon becomes very rocky and enters into the coniferous Fraser fir/red spruce forest ubiquitous to the higher elevations of the national park. The dead Frasers are the unfortunate result of the influx of the non-native balsam wooly adelgid, an insect that latches on and feasts from the tree. The national park is undergoing extensive work and research in trying to save the remaining trees, but has so far had little success. Shortly hereafter the hiker arrives at the junction with the Rainbow Falls Trail, and, after the final  jaunt, the LeConte Lodge is found immediately ahead. The LeConte Lodge provides the only commercial lodging in the national park, as it operates about 10 rustic cabins with no electricity or appliances. The Lodge also operates an office which provides t-shirts and other merchandise for hikers and various amenities for guests of the lodge. For many, this signals the end of their journey, but the actual peaks of Le Conte all have separate trails a short distance from the lodge, with Cliff Tops and Myrtle Point each offering expansive panoramas of the mountains and valleys below.

Maps and Directions

Topographic Maps
The Bullhead Trail is shown on the following 1:24,000-scale topographic maps published by the National Park Service:

Sources

Elevation Information

External links
 Great Smoky Mountains National Park Homepage
 LeConte Lodge Homepage
 Hiking the Bullhead Trail to Mt. LeConte

Hiking trails to Mount Le Conte
Protected areas of Sevier County, Tennessee
Great Smoky Mountains National Park